USAV Vulcan (FMS-789) was a floating machine shop operated by the United States Army. She was built at the Bethlehem Steel Company shipyard on Staten Island, New York and delivered in September 1954.

Vulcan was retired from Army service sometime prior to April 2010 and acquired by the Seattle Maritime Academy for use as a floating classroom. She was towed to their facility east of the Ballard Bridge on 10 April 2010.

References

Ships of the United States Army
1954 ships
Ships built in Staten Island